LGBT teen fiction may refer to:

Gay male teen fiction
Lesbian literature#Young adult fiction
Bisexual literature#Young adult fiction